Chrey is a khum (commune) of Moung Ruessei District in Battambang Province in north-western Cambodia.

Villages

 Doun Tri
 Angkrong
 Tuol Ta Thon
 Mreah Prov
 Chrey Muoy
 Chrey Pir
 Chrey Cheung
 Chong Chamnay

References

Communes of Battambang province
Moung Ruessei District